{|

{{Infobox ship career
| Hide header = 
| Ship country = 
| Ship flag = 
| Ship name = *Port Melbourne (1955-1972)
Therisos Express (1972?-1975?)
Danae (1975-1992)
Starlight Express (1992?-1994?)
Baltica (1994-1996)
Princess Danae (1996-2013)
Lisboa (2013-2015) 
| Ship namesake = Lisbon (Lisboa in Portuguese)
| Ship owner = Portuscale Cruises
| Ship operator = *Port Line (1955-1972)
Delian Cruises (1975-1979)
Costa Cruises (1979-1990)
Prestige Cruises (1990-1992)
Classic International Cruises (1996-2012)
Portuscale Cruises (2013)
Unknown French Operator (2015) 
| Ship registry = *1955–1972: London, 
1994–2001: Panama City, 
2001–2015: Madeira, 
| Ship route = 
| Ship ordered = 
| Ship builder = Harland and Wolff
| Ship original cost = 
| Ship yard number = 
| Ship way number = 
| Ship laid down = 
| Ship launched = 10 March 1955
| Ship completed = 1955
| Ship christened = 1955
| Ship acquired = 
| Ship maiden voyage = 1955
| Ship in service = 1955
| Ship out of service = 2015
| Ship identification = *

Callsign: CQTK
| Ship fate = Scrapped in 2015
| Ship notes = 
}}

|}

MS Princess Danae was a cruise liner. The ship was designed by Harland & Wolff as a freighter in Belfast built and ran in 1954 as Port Melbourne, a fast cargo liner for Port Line's UK-Australia express service. She was planned to be rebuilt as a car ferry, the Therisos Express, but instead became the cruise ship Danae. In later years, she was named Starlight Express, Baltica, and then Princess Danae.

From 1994 until 2012, the ship was operated by Classic International Cruises as the Princess Danae. In late summer of 2012, the ship was detained in Dublin, Ireland for the non-payment of a fuel bill. Early in 2013, she was bought by the recently created Portuguese cruise company Portuscale Cruises and renamed Lisboa. She was scrapped at Aliağa on 24 July 2015.
Her sister ship was the Princess Daphne, built as Port Sydney''.

References

External links
 M/S Port Melbourne.

Cruise ships of Portugal
1955 ships